The 1935–36 Long Island Blackbirds men's basketball team represented Long Island University during the 1935–36 NCAA men's basketball season in the United States. The head coach was Clair Bee, coaching in his fifth season with the Blackbirds. The team finished the season with a 26–0 record and was retroactively named the national champion by the Premo-Porretta Power Poll.

References

LIU Brooklyn Blackbirds men's basketball seasons
Long Island
NCAA Division I men's basketball tournament championship seasons
Long Island Blackbirds Men's Basketball Team
Long Island Blackbirds Men's Basketball Team